The fifth season of the American television medical drama Grey's Anatomy, created by Shonda Rhimes, commenced airing on American Broadcasting Company (ABC) in the United States on September 25, 2008 and concluded on May 14, 2009 with 24 aired episodes. The season follows the story of a group of surgeons as they go through their residency, while they also deal with the personal challenges and relationships with their mentors. Season 5 had 13 series regulars with 12 of them returning from the previous season, out of which 8 are part of the original cast. The season aired in the Thursday night time-slot at 9:00 pm. The season was officially released on DVD as a seven disc boxset under the title of Grey's Anatomy: The Complete Fifth Season – More Moments on September 9, 2009 by Buena Vista Home Entertainment.

Episodes 

The number in the "No. overall" column refers to the episode's number within the overall series, whereas the number in the "No. in season" column refers to the episode's number within this particular season. "U.S. viewers in millions" refers to the number of Americans in millions who watched the episodes live. The fifth season's episodes are altogether 1080 minutes in length. Each episode of this season is named after a song.

Cast and characters

Main 
 Ellen Pompeo as Dr. Meredith Grey
 Sandra Oh as Dr. Cristina Yang
 Katherine Heigl as Dr. Izzie Stevens
 Justin Chambers as Dr. Alex Karev
 T. R. Knight as Dr. George O'Malley
 Chandra Wilson as Dr. Miranda Bailey
 James Pickens Jr. as Dr. Richard Webber
 Sara Ramirez as Dr. Callie Torres
 Eric Dane as Dr. Mark Sloan
 Chyler Leigh as Dr. Lexie Grey
 Brooke Smith as Dr. Erica Hahn
 Kevin McKidd as Dr. Owen Hunt
 Patrick Dempsey as Dr. Derek Shepherd

Recurring 
 Jessica Capshaw as Dr. Arizona Robbins
 Melissa George as Dr. Sadie Harris
 Kimberly Elise as Rebecca Swender
 Amy Madigan as Dr. Katharine Wyatt
 Eric Stoltz as William Dunn
 Mary McDonnell as Dr. Virginia Dixon
 Brandon Scott as Dr. Ryan Spalding
 Jennifer Westfeldt as Jen Harmon
 Ben Shenkman as Rob Harmon
 Shannon Lucio as Amanda 
 Samantha Mathis as Melinda Prescott
 Jeffrey Dean Morgan as Denny Duquette

Notable guests 
 Kate Walsh as Dr. Addison Montgomery
 Tyne Daly as Carolyn Maloney Shepherd
 Loretta Devine as Adele Webber 
 Héctor Elizondo as Carlos Torres
 Bernadette Peters as Sarabeth Breyers
 Faye Dunaway as Margaret Campbell 
 Debra Mooney as Evelyn Hunt
 Sharon Lawrence as Robbie Stevens
 Perrey Reeves as Margaret 
 Mark Saul as Dr. Steve Mostow
 Brandon Scott as Dr. Ryan Spalding 
 Steven W. Bailey as Joe, the Bartender 
 Lauren Stamile as Nurse Rose
 Robin Pearson Rose as Patricia Murphy
 Leslie Grossman as Lauren Hammer
 Liza Weil as Alison Clark
 Leslie Odom, Jr. as P.J. Walling 
 Nicole Cummins as Paramedic Nicole 
 Audra McDonald as Naomi Bennett
 Taye Diggs as Sam Bennett
 Grant Show as Archer Montgomery

Production

Crew 
The season was produced by Touchstone Television ABC Studios, The Mark Gordon Company, ShondaLand, and was distributed by Buena Vista International, Inc. The executive producers were creator Shonda Rhimes, Betsy Beers, Mark Gordon, Krista Vernoff, Rob Corn, Mark Wilding, Joan Rater, and James D. Parriott. The regular directors were Rob Corn, Eric Stoltz, and Tom Verica.

Casting 
The fifth season had 13 roles receiving star-billing, with 12 of them returning from the previous season, out of which 8 are part of the original cast from the first season. All of the 13 regulars portray surgeons who work in the fictional Seattle Grace Hospital. Ellen Pompeo continued her role as protagonist and narrator of the series, Dr. Meredith Grey, a resident physician and a surgeon. Sandra Oh played resident Dr. Cristina Yang, best-friend of Meredith and fellow surgeon. Katherine Heigl portrayed resident Dr. Isobel "Izzie" Stevens whose previous relationship with the now-deceased patient Denny Duquette threatens her career once again. Justin Chambers acted as surgical resident Dr. Alexander "Alex" Karev who becomes Izzie's husband, while T. R. Knight portrayed Dr. George O'Malley, an insecure resident whose sensitive personality puts his life in danger. General surgeon and Chief Resident Dr. Miranda Bailey was portrayed by Chandra Wilson, while general surgeon and Chief of Surgery Dr. Richard Webber was played by James Pickens, Jr. Sara Ramirez portrayed orthopedic surgeon Dr. Calliope "Callie" Torres whose storylines during the season revolve around her recently-discovered bisexuality. Eric Dane's character, plastic surgeon Dr. Mark Sloan, begins a relationship with intern Dr. Lexie Grey, Meredith's half-sister portrayed by Chyler Leigh. Brooke Smith appeared in 7 episodes as cardiothoracic surgeon Dr. Erica Hahn, Callie's love-interest, who eventually resigns and moves away. Patrick Dempsey portrayed neurosurgeon Dr. Derek Shepherd whose relationship with Meredith Grey is the series' main storyline.

Although originally introduced as a recurring character in the season premiere, trauma surgeon Dr. Owen Hunt was promoted to a series-regular in the fourteenth episode of the season "Beat Your Heart Out". He was portrayed by Kevin McKidd and was conceived as a love-interest to resident Cristina Yang. Originally only signed onto the show until December 2008, Kevin McKidd was upgraded to regular status after appearing in 5 episodes. Shonda Rhimes said, "I am excited to have Kevin McKidd joining us for the season, he’s been a delight to collaborate with and brings incredible passion, talent and creativity to his work." Weeks after Hunt's first appearance on the show, Matt Roush of TVGuide comments that "Hunt/McKidd is the most encouraging thing to happen to Grey's Anatomy in quite a while." Robert Rorke of the New York Post states that McKidd was brought in as Hunt to "boost the sagging fortunes" of the show's ratings. Kelley L. Carter of USA Today, describes Hunt as "hardcore" and "the antithesis of the other males on the show."

Numerous supporting characters have been given expansive and recurring appearances in the progressive storyline, including: Melissa George as Sadie Harris, Kimberly Elise as Dr. Jo Swender, Jessica Capshaw as Dr. Arizona Robbins, Amy Madigan as Dr. Wyatt, Mary McDonnell as Dr. Virginia Dixon, Eric Stoltz as William Dunn, Jennifer Westfeldt as Jen Harmon, Ben Shenkman as Rob Harmon, Shannon Lucio as Amanda and Samantha Mathis as Melinda. Jeffrey Dean Morgan reappeared as the deceased Denny Duquette in Izzie's hallucinations due to a brain tumor. Former series-regular Kate Walsh returned to the show with a special guest-star billing as Dr. Addison Montgomery along with fellow Private Practice stars Audra McDonald portraying Naomi Bennett, Taye Diggs portraying Sam Bennett and Grant Show portraying Dr. Archer Montgomery. Tyne Daly also appeared receiving a special guest-star in the role of Carolyn Maloney Shepherd, Derek's mother, while Héctor Elizondo appeared as Carlos Torres, Callie's father.

Reception

Ratings

Critical response 
While few critics weighed in their point of view on the fourth season, several had opinions on the fifth season. Alan Sepinwall from the Newark Star-Ledger said "Overall, it really feels more like the good-old-days than Grey's has in a long time" referring to season 5. Also regarding season 5, Misha Davenport from Chicago Sun-Times said "Tonight's premiere hits on all the things the show does so well. There is romance, heartbreak, humor and a few moments that will move fans to tears." Robert Bianco from USA Today said "Happily, it now seems to have landed on solid ground, with its best ensemble and most-engaging stories in years" regarding the show's fifth season.

The return of Izzie's deceased fiancé Denny and the resumption of their romance during the season also proved unpopular with fans, and was deemed "the world's worst storyline" by Mary McNamara of the Los Angeles Times. McNamara was also critical of the episode "Now or Never", which saw Izzie flatline following neurosurgery, opining that Izzie ought to die. The episode in which Izzie married long-term love Alex received 15.3 million viewers, the largest television audience of the night.

Izzie's cancer storyline received a mixed response from the medical community. Otis Brawley, chief medical officer at the American Cancer Society, commented that Izzie's treatment options were unrealistic. Whereas in the show she was offered the drug interleukin-2, in reality the drug is never recommended to patients when melanoma has spread to the brain, as it can cause bleeding and strokes. Brawley explained that such patients would instead be offered radiosurgery. Conversely however, Tim Turnham, executive director of the Melanoma Research Foundation, praised Grey's Anatomy for bringing about greater public awareness of melanoma, stating: "We welcome the national spotlight Grey's Anatomy has created for melanoma and its efforts to encourage viewers to learn more about the importance of prevention, early detection and research."

Accolades 

Chandra Wilson won the 2009 NAACP Outstanding Actress in a Drama Series for her portrayal of Dr. Miranda Bailey during the season.

DVD release 
The fifth season was released as a widescreen 7-disc Region 1 DVD box set in the USA on September 15, 2009, with the title Grey's Anatomy: The Complete Fifth Season – More Moments. Each of these releases also contained DVD extras, including footage from behind-the-scenes, deleted scenes and extended episodes. The same set was released on November 4, 2009 in Region 4 and on August 23, 2010 in Region 2.

References 

General references 
 
 
 

2009 American television seasons
2008 American television seasons
Grey's Anatomy seasons